The Commons is a 420 SF open-air shopping center located on Retail Commons Parkway at the intersection of Exit 12 on Interstate 81 and Route 45 in Martinsburg, West Virginia.

History
The initial plans for The Commons were submitted to the Berkeley County Planning Commission in February 2007.  The original plans called for a 104,231 SF tenant to be beside Target. It was reported by The Journal on February 12, 2008, that a major tenant had backed out of the project.  The unnamed major tenant was later replaced with Dick's Sporting Goods (50,000 SF) and a series of others, ranging from 1,000 to 15,000 SF.

Development started on The Commons shopping center in May 2008.  The  site was developed and is managed by AIG Baker, LLC. The first store (Bed Bath and Beyond) opened in early July 2009 with 8 other anchors opening within the next 45 days. Staples is the only major anchor that did not have a 2009 opening.

Bed Bath & Beyond's store at The Commons is its third in West Virginia.

In December 2012, an American Automobile Association office moved into the center from downtown. A hotel is slated to be added in 2013.

Anchors
 Target
 Dick's Sporting Goods
 Books A Million
 Five Below
 Best Buy
 Michaels Arts and Crafts
 TJ Maxx
 Bed Bath and Beyond
 Petsmart

Other tenants
 Logan's Roadhouse - Outparcel
 MedExpress Urgent Care - Outparcel 
 Ledo Pizza
 Tropical Smoothie Cafe
 Subway
 Starbucks Coffee - Inside Target
 Aldi
 Hair Cuttery
 Euro Nails
 Beach Bum Tanning
 Sprint
 AT&T Protel
 GameStop
 Old Navy
 Sweet Frog Premium Frozen Yogurt
 Armed Forces Recruiting Office
 Dollar Tree
 Sally Beauty
 AAA 
 ULTA Beauty
 Vape Saloon
 Famous Footwear
 El Pollon
 Vision 2020
 Xfinity
 Jersey Mike’s
 AT&T
 Mattress Firm
 T-Mobile
 Taco Loco
 GNC

Cornerstone Development  (Under Construction)
 Hilton Garden Inn 
 Extended Stay Motel
 Cornerstone Apartments

References

Berkeley County Planning Commission - The Commons
Newspaper Article - July 11, 2009 - Herald-Mail
Online Discussion Forum discussing the progress

External links
 

Buildings and structures in Martinsburg, West Virginia
Shopping malls established in 2009
Shopping malls in West Virginia
Tourist attractions in Berkeley County, West Virginia
2009 establishments in West Virginia